The 2021 NCAA Division I FCS football season, part of college football in the United States, was organized by the National Collegiate Athletic Association (NCAA) at the Division I Football Championship Subdivision (FCS) level.

After the prior season was impacted by the COVID-19 pandemic in the United States, resulting in some conferences canceling their seasons and significant rescheduling by other conferences, the 2021 season returned to its traditional fall scheduling. The season ended with a single-elimination tournament, with North Dakota State winning the championship game on January 8, 2022 at Toyota Stadium in Frisco, Texas.

Conference changes and new programs

Membership changes for 2021

On January 14, 2021, the Western Athletic Conference, which had last played football in the 2012 season as an FBS league, announced that it would reinstate football in the fall 2021 season as an FCS league. This coincides with the arrival of four new members from the Southland Conference, all located in Texas and fielding FCS football programs—Abilene Christian, Lamar, Sam Houston State, and Stephen F. Austin. Original plans were for the four Southland members, as well as Big Sky Conference member Southern Utah, to join in 2022, at which time the football league would restart. However, the entry of the Texas schools and the restart of football were moved forward to July 2021 when the Southland chose to expel its departing members.  These schools will join Dixie State and Tarleton State, which joined the all-sports WAC in July 2020, in the revived WAC football league. Southern Utah's entry remains on the original July 2022 schedule. On the same day, UTRGV, currently a full but non-football WAC member, announced that it planned to launch an FCS football program no later than 2024. While it did not mention a conference affiliation, its existing WAC membership makes it all but certain that the school will join WAC football.

On January 29, 2021, the ASUN Conference announced that it too would begin sponsoring FCS football in 2022, with its first five members being full members Kennesaw State and North Alabama (who had been football-only members of the Big South Conference), Eastern Kentucky and Jacksonville State from the Ohio Valley Conference, and Central Arkansas from the Southland Conference. On February 23, the ASUN announced that it had entered into a football partnership with the WAC, with the WAC's four incoming Texas members joined by the incoming ASUN schools in a round-robin league officially branded as the "ASUN–WAC Challenge" or "WAC–ASUN Challenge". Dixie State and Tarleton were to be included in alliance members' schedules, but not in alliance standings due to their ongoing Division I transitions, technically making them FCS independents for at least the 2021 season. While the ASUN–WAC Challenge was organized with seven members, meeting the NCAA-imposed minimum of six playoff-eligible schools for an automatic FCS tournament bid, it did not meet the NCAA's "continuity" criterion for eligibility, based on the length of time the member schools have been in the same league. ASUN and WAC jointly proposed an amendment to NCAA bylaws to make the partnership eligible for an automatic bid. Their proposal was successful, resulting in an automatic qualifier to the postseason tournament from the seven-team Challenge, colloquially referred to as "AQ7".

Future membership changes
On September 17, the ASUN announced that Austin Peay would move from the OVC to the ASUN effective July 1, 2022. Peay will become the ASUN's sixth scholarship FCS football program, joining the three 2021 arrivals and current Big South football associates Kennesaw State and North Alabama. This in turn enables the ASUN to launch its football league in 2022 with an automatic bid to the FCS playoffs, as North Alabama will complete its transition from Division II to Division I in July 2022 and become playoff-eligible. Texas A&M–Commerce will also be moving to the Southland Conference from the Lone Star Conference starting in July 2022.

On October 22, The Action Network reported that James Madison was on the verge of joining the FBS Sun Belt Conference alongside three members of another FBS league, Conference USA. On November 6, James Madison made its move to the Sun Belt official, effective no later than July 2023. The Dukes had been scheduled to play as FBS independents in the 2022 season.

On November 5, Conference USA, which had nine of its schools depart to other separate conferences, handed out invitations to two of its four newcomer universities, FCS programs Jacksonville State and Sam Houston. They were both accepted and their C-USA membership takes effect also no later than July 2023.

One week later on November 12, the Western Athletic Conference announced that Incarnate Word would join from the Southland after the 2021–22 school year. The Southland also nearly lost McNeese to the WAC, but the Cowboys ultimately remained in the Southland. In late June 2022, the Incarnate Words announced, they will no longer join the WAC, and commit to staying in the Southland Conference.

Rule changes
The following rule changes, recommended by the NCAA Football Rules Committee for the 2021 season on March 12 of that year, were approved by the NCAA Playing Rules Oversight Panel on April 22.
 In overtime, teams scoring a touchdown will be required to attempt a two-point conversion starting with the second overtime period (previously the third overtime period) and, if still tied, teams will be required to attempt alternating two point conversions starting with the third overtime (previously the fifth overtime period). 
 Permanently extending the team area from between the 25-yard lines to between the 20-yard lines. A rule implemented for the 2020 season amid the COVID-19 pandemic had extended the area to between the 15-yard lines, but it had been scheduled to revert to the 25 for 2021.
 Creating a process for a review panel that can be used by teams and/or conferences for instances of teams feigning injuries to slow down teams' momentum or stop the game clock.
 Explicitly prohibiting video board and lighting system operators from creating "any distraction that obstructs play", with violations being deemed unsportsmanlike conduct.
 If replay overturns a call on the field, the game clock will only be adjusted inside of the last 2:00 of the first half and the last 5:00 of the second half.

One recommended change that would have limited blocks below the waist to inside the tackle box was not approved.

Another rule change was made during the season:
 After the FBS's Pitt quarterback Kenny Pickett's fake slide in the 2021 ACC Championship Game against Wake Forest, the NCAA Football Rules Committee changed the interpretation of the "QB Slide Rule" to require officials to interpret a fake slide as "giving himself up" and blow the play dead.

"Points of Emphasis" for the 2021 season include:
 Penalize any taunting action toward an opponent.
 Automatic unsportsmanlike conduct penalties toward a coach who leaves the team area or goes onto the field of play to argue officials' decisions or calls.
 Being more alert to players significantly in violation of uniform rules (specifically the pants, jerseys, and T-shirts that extend below the torso) and to send violators out of the game to correct the issue.

Other headlines
 September 4 – In Kevin Kelley's debut as head coach of Presbyterian, Ren Hefley threw for 10 touchdowns in the Blue Hose's 84–43 win over NAIA member St. Andrews, breaking the previous FCS record of 9 first set in 1984 by Willie Totten of Mississippi Valley State and equaled in 2007 by Drew Hubel of Portland State. Blue Hose backup quarterback Tyler Huff added 2 TD passes to set a new Division I team record (for both FCS and FBS) of 12, surpassing the previous record of 11 thrown by David Klingler of Houston against Eastern Washington in 1990.
 November 12 – The Utah Legislature passed a bill to change the name of Dixie State University to Utah Tech University, effective in the 2022–23 school year. The nickname of Trailblazers will not be affected.

Kickoff games

"Week Zero"
The regular season began with three games on Saturday, August 28:
 Indiana State 26, Eastern Illinois 21
 MEAC/SWAC Challenge at Center Parc Stadium in Atlanta: North Carolina Central 23, Alcorn State 14
 San Jose State 45, Southern Utah 14

FCS team wins over FBS teams
September 2, 2021:
 UC Davis 19, Tulsa 17
 Eastern Washington 35, UNLV 33
September 3, 2021:
 South Dakota State 42, Colorado State 23
September 4, 2021:
 Holy Cross 38, UConn 28
 Montana 13, No. 20 Washington 7
 East Tennessee State 23, Vanderbilt 3
September 11, 2021:
 Duquesne 28, Ohio 26
 Jacksonville State 20, Florida State 17
September 18, 2021:
 Incarnate Word 42, Texas State 34
 Northern Arizona 21, Arizona 19
November 6, 2021:
 Rhode Island 35, UMass 22
November 13, 2021
 Maine 35, UMass 10

Non-DI team wins over FCS teams
September 3, 2021:
Southern Connecticut 28, Central Connecticut 21
September 4, 2021:
West Florida 42, McNeese State 36
Indiana Wesleyan 28, Valparaiso 10

Upsets
This section lists instances of unranked teams defeating ranked teams during the season.

Regular season
During the regular season, 33 unranked teams have defeated a ranked team.

September 4, 2021:
Furman 29, No. 25 North Carolina A&T 18
September 11, 2021:
Merrimack 35, No. 24 Holy Cross 21
September 25, 2021
Holy Cross 45, No. 20 Monmouth 15
Eastern Kentucky 35, No. 19 Austin Peay 27
UT Martin 34, No. 9 Jacksonville State 31
October 2, 2021
Elon 20, No. 22 Richmond 7
The Citadel 35, No. 18 VMI 24
October 9, 2021
Idaho State 27, No. 7 UC Davis 17
South Dakota 20, No. 13 North Dakota 13
Youngstown State 41, No. 16 Missouri State 33
October 16, 2021
Dartmouth 38, No. 23 New Hampshire 21
Chattanooga 21, No. 10 East Tennessee State 16
Sacramento State 28, No. 5 Montana 27
Stony Brook 34, No. 14 Delaware 17
Towson 28, No. 12 Rhode Island 7
October 22, 2021
Columbia 19, No. 25 Dartmouth 0
October 23, 2021
Weber State 35, No. 2 Eastern Washington 34
Illinois State 20, No. 15 South Dakota 14
McNeese State 28, No. 16 Incarnate Word 20
October 30, 2021
William & Mary 31, No. 4 Villanova 18
Maine 45, No. 24 Rhode Island 24
November 5, 2021
Dartmouth 31, No. 20т Princeton 7
November 6, 2021
Portland State 30, No. 24 Weber State 18
Delaware 24, No. 20т William & Mary 3
Illinois State 17, No. 13 Northern Iowa 10 OT
Stephen F. Austin 31, No. 25 Eastern Kentucky 17
November 13, 2021
Alcorn State 31, No. 24 Prairie View A&M 29
Furman 37, No. 21 VMI 31
Mercer 10, No. 22т Chattanooga 6
November 20, 2021
Southeast Missouri State 31, No. 13 UT Martin 14
Nicholls 45, No. 15 Southeastern Louisiana 42
Youngstown State 35, No. 17 Southern Illinois 18
Elon 43, No. 25 Rhode Island 28

Bowl games

Regular season top 10 matchups
Rankings reflect the Stats Perform Poll.
Week 3
No. 3 James Madison defeated No. 9 Weber State, 37–24 (Stewart Stadium, Ogden, Utah)
Week 5
No. 6 Eastern Washington defeated  No. 4 Montana, 30–24 (Roos Field, Cheney, Washington)
No. 5 North Dakota State defeated No. 10 North Dakota, 16–10 (Alerus Center, Grand Forks, North Dakota)
Week 6
No. 8 Southern Illinois defeated No. 2 South Dakota State, 42–41 OT (Dana J. Dykhouse Stadium, Brookings, South Dakota)
Week 10
No. 4 Montana State defeated No. 5 Eastern Washington, 23–20 (Roos Field, Cheney, Washington)
No. 9 South Dakota State defeated No. 2 North Dakota State, 27–19 (Dana J. Dykhouse Stadium, Brookings, South Dakota)
Week 11
No. 7 Eastern Washington defeated No. 6 UC Davis, 38–20 (UC Davis Health Stadium, Davis, California)
Week 12
No. 6 Montana defeated No. 7 Montana State, 29–10 (Washington–Grizzly Stadium, Missoula, Montana)

Rankings 

The top 25 from the Stats Perform and USA Today Coaches Polls.

Pre-season polls

Final rankings

Conference standings

Conference summaries

SWAC Championship Game

Postseason
After the prior season's playoffs were reduced to a 16-team bracket, FCS returned to a 24-team bracket for this season: 11 of the teams were decided via automatic bids issued to conference champions (listed below) and 13 teams were determined via at-large bids; the top eight teams were seeded.

Playoff qualifiers

Automatic berths for conference champions

At large qualifiers

Abstentions
Ivy League – Dartmouth
Mid-Eastern Athletic Conference – South Carolina State
Southwestern Athletic Conference – Jackson State

NCAA Division I playoff bracket

Source:

Coaching changes

Preseason and in-season
This is restricted to coaching changes that took place on or after May 1, 2021. For coaching changes that occurred earlier in 2021, see 2020 NCAA Division I FCS end-of-season coaching changes.

End of season

See also 
 2021 NCAA Division I FBS football season
 2021 NCAA Division II football season
 2021 NCAA Division III football season
 2021 NAIA football season

References